Wang Xinxin (born 27 April 27, 1981, in Shenyang) is a Chinese football coach and a former international football player. He last managed China League One club Guizhou Hengfeng.

Club career
Wang Xinxin started his career with Liaoning F.C., coming through their youth team and immediately established himself into the senior team in 2002 where he made twenty-five appearances and scored nine goals in his debut season. As a prolific attacking midfielder Wang would attract the interests of the reigning Chinese Super League champions Shenzhen Jianlibao, who he transferred to on loan at the beginning of the 2005 league season. At his new club he was unable to replicate the success they had from the previous season and ended the season in a disappointing twelfth. After his disappointing season with Shenzhen Jianlibao, Wang Xinxin returned to Liaoning FC where he established himself as a key member of the team for three seasons until Liaoning were relegated in the 2008 season.

Wang Xinxin would transfer to Tianjin TEDA for four million yuan in the 2009 season after they gained qualification to the AFC Champions League. Within the tournament he would play in four games as Tianjin were knocked out within the group stages, however while Wang Xinxin would become at vital member within the team the club could not replicate their previous season's results and finished in a disappointing sixth at the end of the 2009 league season. This would see former Chinese coach Arie Haan come into the team and made Wang Xinxin captain of the team. This would seem to work as Tianjin would go on to become runners-up of the 2010 league season and go on to play in the 2011 AFC Champions League where Wang Xinxin lead the team in two games as they were knocked out in the last sixteen. He fared better within the 2011 Chinese FA Cup when he guided the club to a 2–1 victory against Shandong Luneng Taishan in the final.

Wang announced his retirement in July 2016.

Managerial career
On 26 November 2019, Wang was appointed as the manager of Guizhou Hengfeng.

International career
After his promising start to his professional football career with Liaoning F.C., Wang would quickly draw the attentions of the Chinese national football team with the newly appointed caretaker manager Shen Xiangfu selecting him in his first squad against Syria on December 7, 2002, in a 3–1 win where he also scored his first goal for his country. After several further friendlies, he would be dropped from the team after he was unable to replicate his goalscoring form. It was only once he joined Tianjin that was he selected for the national team once again, when the new manager Gao Hongbo came in to select him for his first squad on May 29, 2009, in a game against Germany that ended in a 1–1 draw.

Career statistics 
Statistics accurate as of match played 15 July 2016

Honours
Tianjin TEDA
Chinese FA Cup: 2011

References

External links

Player stats at sohu.com

1981 births
Living people
Footballers from Shenyang
Chinese footballers
China international footballers
Liaoning F.C. players
Shenzhen F.C. players
Tianjin Jinmen Tiger F.C. players
Chinese Super League players
Footballers at the 2002 Asian Games
Association football midfielders
Asian Games competitors for China